QW Puppis (QW Pup) is a class F3V (yellow-white dwarf) star in the constellation Puppis. Its apparent magnitude is 4.49 and it is approximately 69.5 light years away based on parallax.

It is a Gamma Doradus variable, ranging from 4.5 to 4.47 magnitude with a period of 0.96 days.

References

Puppis
F-type main-sequence stars
Gamma Doradus variables
Puppis, I
Puppis, QW
CD-46 2977
034834
2740
055892
Gliese and GJ objects